Labord's chameleon (Furcifer labordi) is a semelparous species of chameleon, a lizard in the family Chamaeleonidae. The species is endemic to Madagascar.

Etymology
The specific name, labordi, is in honor of French adventurer Jean Laborde.

Geographic range 
Laborde's chameleon is associated with spiny and deciduous forests in the south-west regions of Madagascar.

Life cycle
Like other Furcifer species (F. antimena, F. lateralis), F. labordi has an obligate year-long lifecycle. It lives for only about 4 to 5 months, making it the shortest lifespan ever recorded for a four-legged vertebrate. In their natural habitat, eggs hatch with the first rains in November. Their initial growth is rapid, and adulthood is reached by January, at which time they breed. By late February or early March, females have deposited the eggs which will hatch the next year, and the entire population dies until the next hatching. No other tetrapod has exhibited such a short lifespan.

In captivity
Juveniles grow very rapidly, reaching adulthood after 3 months. Females that were properly fed grew with eggs and a vivid coloration, whereas females that were fed a less caloric diet grew thinner and only showed a green coloration.

References

Further reading
Grandidier A (1872). "Descriptions de quelques Reptiles nouveaux découverts à Madagascar en 1870 ". Annales des Sciences Naturelles, Cinquième Série [Fifth Series], Zoologie et Paléontologie 15 (20): 6–11. ("Chamæleo Labordi ", new species, p. 7). (in French).

External links
Labord's chameleons of Madagascar live fast, die young (BBC, Earth News).

Furcifer
chameleon
chameleon
Vulnerable biota of Africa
Reptiles described in 1872
Taxa named by Alfred Grandidier